David Hugh Segal (born 20 March 1937) was a British track and field athlete who competed in the sprints. He had best times of 9.5 seconds for the 100 yards and 21.0 seconds for the 220 yards. While competing in the United States he ran 20.4 seconds for the straight 220 yards.

He competed for Great Britain in the 1960 Summer Olympics held in Rome, Italy in the 4 x 100 metre relay where he won the bronze medal with his team mates Peter Radford, David Jones and Neville Whitehead.

Segal was also an excellent 200 meter sprinter. He was a European 200m silver medallist in 1958 and was British AAA 220 yard champion and record holder in 1958 and '59. In Rome he was in the 200m semi final but was disqualified for two false starts. While not a favorite he had been ranked as high as 8th in the world in the 200m by Track and Field News.

Before Rome he competed in the 1956 Summer Olympics in Melbourne, Australia, in the 4x100m relay which placed 5th in the final. At one time he held the English Native Record for the 220 yards and the 300 yards running the longer distance in 30 seconds flat. On rare occasions he ran the 400 meters with a fastest time of 48.2 seconds. Following the 1960 Olympics Segal left the UK for Furman University in Greenville, South Carolina where he continued his track career and has lived in the United States since then. In 2008 Segal was inducted into the Athletic Hall of Fame at his alma mater Furman University where as a competitor in the Southern Conference Championships he won nine individual titles and five relay championships.

At the 1961 Maccabiah Games in Israel, he won the 200 m race, and won a gold medal in the 1600 m relay.

References

 

Living people
1937 births
Athletes from London
English male sprinters
British male sprinters
Olympic male sprinters
Olympic athletes of Great Britain
Olympic bronze medallists for Great Britain
Athletes (track and field) at the 1956 Summer Olympics
Athletes (track and field) at the 1960 Summer Olympics
Commonwealth Games gold medallists for England
Commonwealth Games medallists in athletics
Athletes (track and field) at the 1958 British Empire and Commonwealth Games
European Athletics Championships medalists
Furman University alumni
Medalists at the 1960 Summer Olympics
Olympic bronze medalists in athletics (track and field)
Members of Thames Valley Harriers
Maccabiah Games gold medalists for Great Britain
Maccabiah Games medalists in athletics
Competitors at the 1961 Maccabiah Games
Medallists at the 1958 British Empire and Commonwealth Games